Red vs. Blue, often abbreviated as RvB, is a comic science fiction video web series created by Rooster Teeth Productions and distributed through the Internet and on DVD. The story centers on two opposite teams fighting a civil war in the middle of a desolate box canyon (Blood Gulch) in a parody of first-person shooter (FPS) games, military life, and science fiction films. Initially intended to be a short series of six to eight episodes, the project quickly and unexpectedly achieved significant popularity following its Internet premiere on April 1, 2003. In its run, the series has had eighteen full seasons and five mini-series that extended the series' plot. The fifth season of the original Blood Gulch Chronicles series ended with episode 100, released on June 28, 2007. 

Three mini-series—Out of Mind, Recovery One, and Relocated —and the three-part Recollection trilogy containing the full-length Reconstruction (2008), Recreation (2009) and Revelation (2010) series (Seasons 6–8) have extended the plot. The Project Freelancer saga began with Season 9 (2011) and follows two separate stories: a continuation to the Recollection trilogy and a prequel set before the events of The Blood Gulch Chronicles. The two stories are continued in two further mini-series—MIA and Where There's a Will, There's a Wall—and concluded in Season 10 (2012). 

Burnie Burns confirmed in What's Trending that the series would continue with Season 11, which premiered on June 14, 2013; and Season 11 was later followed by Season 12 and Season 13. In 2016, Season 14 was released as the first anthology season, consisting of several canon and non-canon stories created by in-house writers as well as several outside writers; Freddie Wong of RocketJump, Chris Roberson (creator of iZOMBIE), Ben Singer and Chad James of Death Battle, Ernest Cline (author of Ready Player One and Armada), Arin Hanson and Dan Avidan of Game Grumps, etc. Season 15 debuted in 2017, continuing the canonical story following the events of Season 13. In March, Joe Nicolosi announced Season 16 which focused the events after the last season with a reduced episode count. Nicolosi stepped down after Season 16 concluded, with Jason Weight taking over writing duties and both Josh Ornelas and Austin Clark taking over directing duties for Season 17, which had an even more reduced episode count.

On January 15, 2020, Season 18 was confirmed to be in development with a brief 3-second clip being shown in a promo trailer for upcoming Rooster Teeth releases. The season was done by Death Battle writers Noël Wiggins, Joshua Kazemi, and Ben Singer based on a story by  the season's director Torrian Crawford.

Episodes are released earlier for subscribers of Rooster Teeth's premium service, originally known as Sponsors and renamed in 2016 as FIRST.

Series overview

Episodes

The Blood Gulch Chronicles

Season 1 (2003)
The inaugural season of RVB introduces the Reds and Blues of Blood Gulch, who instead of fighting each other talk with one another and do nothing. However, the arrival of a female mercenary and a psychotic AI changes everything.

Season 2 (2004)
The second season introduces the medic Doc, and the psychotic AI O'Malley's quest to rule the universe forces the Reds and Blues to work together.

Season 3 (2004–05)
The conflict between O'Malley and the Reds and Blues takes an explosive turn; literally.

Season 4 (2005–06)
The Reds are back in Blood Gulch, the Blues go on an adventure involving an alien and an energy sword, and O'Malley plots his next move.

Season 5 (2006–07)
The final season of the Blood Gulch Chronicles. The conflict between the Reds and Blues and O'Malley comes to an end.

The Recollection

Season 6: "Reconstruction"(2008)
Over a year after the events of Blood Gulch, Project Freelancer Agent Washington gathers the Reds and Blues together to stop the power-hungry Meta and uncover a conspiracy involving Project Freelancer and the mysterious AI, the Alpha.

Season 7: "Recreation" (2009)
Caboose, Sarge and Grif go on an adventure to try to bring back Church and find Tucker. Elsewhere, old faces return with ill intentions.

Season 8: "Revelation" (2010)
The final season of the Recollection Trilogy. Secrets are revealed, the Reds and Blues have a final showdown with the Meta, and Epsilon Church tries to find closure.

The Project Freelancer Saga

Season 9 (2011)
The Freelancer Saga begins. The present storyline follows the events of Revelation in the Epsilon unit, as Epsilon Church tries to find Tex and fix the memories of the Reds and Blues of Blood Gulch. The past follows Project Freelancer, as the agents deal with growing tensions and mistrust with one another while in conflict against a rogue UNSC faction.

Season 10 (2012)
The Reds and Blues are swept up in Carolina's quest for revenge against Leonard Church, the mastermind of Project Freelancer. Everything will be revealed.

The Chorus Trilogy

The Reds and Blues crash-land on Chorus, a former UNSC colony embroiled in a civil war between the colonial government and a rebel faction. Caught up in the middle of the war, the Reds and Blues learn a sinister party is manipulating both sides for their own gains.

Anthology

Season 14 (2016)
A collection of canonical and non-canonical stories of the RVB universe.

The Shisno Trilogy

Season 15 (2017)
An investigative reporter and her bumbling cameraman search for the Reds and Blues and answers for attacks on the UNSC.

Season 16: "The Shisno Paradox" (2018)
The Reds and Blues attempt to go back in time to prevent Washington's injury, but messing with the space-time continuum will have drastic consequences.

Season 17: "Singularity" (2019)
Donut leads the Reds and Blues against Genkins to restore the space-time continuum.

Season 18: "Zero" (2020)

Miniseries

Notes

References

Lists of machinima series episodes
Red vs. Blue episodes